Elections to West Lindsey District Council were held on 7 May 1998. One third of the council was up for election and the Liberal Democrat party lost overall control of the council to no overall control.

After the election, the composition of the council was
 Liberal Democrat 18
 Independent 9
 Labour 5
 Conservative 4
 Others 1

Election result

References
"Council poll results", The Guardian 9 May 1998 page 16

1998
1998 English local elections
1990s in Lincolnshire